Jennifer Cody Epstein is the author of the novels The Painter from Shanghai, The Gods of Heavenly Punishment, and Wunderland.

Life
Epstein resides in New York City with her husband and daughters. She has a Master of Fine Arts degree in Fiction from Columbia University, a Masters in International relations from Johns Hopkins and a bachelor's degree in Asian Studies and English from Amherst College.

She has written for NBC, HBO and The Wall Street Journal, The Asian Wall Street Journal, The Nation (Thailand), Self, and Mademoiselle magazines. Epstein has also worked in Tokyo and Kyoto in Japan, where she lived for five years as a student, teacher, and journalist, as well as in Hong Kong and Bangkok. She has taught at Columbia University in the United States, and internationally at Doshisha University in Kyoto, Japan.

Epstein’s debut novel, The Painter from Shanghai, is the fictionalized biography of Pan Yuliang who lived from 1895 to 1977. She was a female Chinese painter who was revolutionary in bringing  Western painting styles to China. It took Epstein ten years to complete the novel, which she has noted “is not a factual account of Pan Yuliang’s life, [it is] a re-imagining.” Epstein did much research, helping her to accurately portray the characters and the period. The novel was an international bestseller, published in 14 countries.

Her second novel, The Gods of Heavenly Punishment, is a fictional work exploring America's 1945 firebombing of Tokyo from both Japanese and American perspectives, but especially from that of young Yoshi Kobayashi. In the book, Yoshi has to struggle with the destruction of her city, life, love and secrets. This novel was a work of fiction that allowed Epstein to return to her fascination with Japan, where she had been first an exchange student, then a journalist.

Her third novel, Wunderland, was inspired by actual events. It is set in Nazi Germany, postwar Germany and 1980's New York City, told through the lens of two close childhood friends torn apart by World War II.

References

Writers from New York City
Living people
Year of birth missing (living people)
American women novelists
Novelists from New York (state)
Columbia University School of the Arts alumni
Johns Hopkins University alumni
Amherst College alumni
21st-century American novelists
21st-century American women writers